Little Man's Gonna Fall is a single by the band The Suburbs. It was released by Buy Record's in 1987.

Track listing 
 Little Man's Gonna Fall (3:59)
 Don't Do Me Any Favors (3:53)

Personnel
 Bruce C. Allen - Lead guitar
 Beej Chaney - Vocals, Beejtar
 Michael Halliday - Bass guitar
 Hugo Klaers - Drums
 Chan Poling - Vocals, keyboards

Additional musicians
Tom Burnevik - Sax
Kevin Nord - Trumpet, voice tracker

Credits
 Produced by The Suburbs and Tom Tucker
 All songs by Suburbs
 Cover - Bruce C. Allen
 Special thanks to Metro Studios

Trivia
 The song "Don't Do Me Any Favors" was finally released on Chemistry Set: Songs of the Suburbs, 1978-1987, while the other song on this single, "Little Man's Gonna Fall," has never been released on compact disc.
 The single was handed out to attendees at the Suburbs "final" shows in August 1987 at First Avenue in Minneapolis, MN.

References

"Little Man's Gonna Fall" vinyl single, 1987
Album cover images

External links 
Twin/Tone Records: The Suburbs
The Suburbs Band Site

1987 EPs
The Suburbs albums